England national hockey team may refer to:

 England national bandy team
 England women's national bandy team
 England men's national field hockey team
 England women's national field hockey team
 England men's national ice hockey team (defunct)
 England women's national ice hockey team (defunct)
 England national roller hockey team